Jeffrey L. Barnhart (born March 5, 1956) was a  Republican member of the North Carolina General Assembly representing the state's Eighty-second House District, including constituents in Cabarrus County. A businessman, Barnhart served in the state's House of Representatives from 2001-2011. He resigned September 30, 2011, to join the consulting firm McGuireWoods.

Personal life
Barnhart was born in Waverly, New York to Fred Harrison and Mildred Lorraine Sjostrom Barnhart. He and his wife Jody (Springston) have four children.

Education
Barnhart graduated from Waverly High School in 1974. He then attended Southern Illinois University and earned a Bachelor of Science degree in Industrial Technology in 1981.

Military service
Served in the United States Air Force from 1978-82.

Early Political career
 Cabarrus County Commissioner – 10 years
 Acting County Manager – Cabarrus County – 8 months
 Cabarrus Economic Development Board of Directors – 9 years
 Water & Sewer Authority of Cabarrus County – 6 years

References

Republican Party members of the North Carolina House of Representatives
1956 births
Living people
People from Waverly, Tioga County, New York
21st-century American politicians